The Alabama Christian Movement for Human Rights (ACMHR) was an American civil rights organization in Birmingham, Alabama, which coordinated boycotts and sponsored federal lawsuits aimed at dismantling segregation in Birmingham and Alabama during the civil rights movement. Fred Shuttlesworth, pastor of Bethel Baptist Church, served as president of the group from its founding in 1956 until 1969. The ACMHR's crowning moment came during the pivotal Birmingham campaign which it coordinated along with the Southern Christian Leadership Conference during the spring of 1963.

Founding
Shuttlesworth, the fiery pastor who took over the pulpit of Bethel Baptist Church in 1953, was already a leading figure in the Birmingham movement. He had led an unsuccessful campaign to convince the Birmingham Police Department to hire black officers and accompanied Autherine Lucy and Arthur Shores in the short-lived integration of the University of Alabama. He was membership chairman for the Alabama chapter of the National Association for the Advancement of Colored People and was the featured speaker in a January 1956 Emancipation Rally sponsored by the NAACP.

Later that spring Alabama Attorney General John Patterson successfully headed efforts to ban the NAACP from conducting activities in Alabama. As a result, Shuttlesworth led a group of 11 pastors and laymen who met at A. G. Gaston's Smith & Gaston Funeral Chapel to outline the creation of a group of "free and independent Citizens of the United States of America, and of the State of Alabama" who would "express publicly our determination to press forward persistently for Freedom and Democracy, and the removal from our society any forms of Second Class Citizenship." The group met on June 4, 1956, and drafted a 7-point "Declaration of Principles":

The ACMHR was formally created at a mass meeting of 1,000 enthusiastic blacks at Alford's Sardis Baptist Church the following night. Shuttlesworth, acclaimed unanimously as president of the new group, recounted from the pulpit vicious lynchings and gross lapses of justice across the South, concluding that "these are dark days" before announcing that "hope is not dead. Hope is alive here tonight!" A second meeting at Smith's New Pilgrim Baptist Church attracted additional members, including long-time ACMHR corresponding secretary Lola Hendricks.

Bus desegregation
Initially the ACMHR continued the NAACP's tactics of filing lawsuits challenging enforcement of the city's segregation laws and also modeled itself on the Montgomery Improvement Association in attempting to organize African-American citizens for boycotts and peaceful demonstrations.

Two small actions preceded the ACMHR's first mass demonstration. Two members applied to take the civil service exam in an attempt to become police officers, but were refused by the city's personnel board. The ACMHR sponsored a lawsuit against the board. On December 22, 1956, Carl and Alexandria Baldwin tested the Birmingham Terminal Station's compliance with an Interstate Commerce Commission ruling banning segregation among interstate passengers. They were arrested and a lawsuit was filed.

The first large public action undertaken by the ACMHR was aimed at the city's segregated bus service. After Browder v. Gayle, the decision that ended segregation on Montgomery buses, was upheld on November 13, ACMHR leaders petitioned the city to repeal the ordinances requiring segregated buses in Birmingham. When the city refused, Shuttlesworth organized a display of peaceful civil disobedience in which hundreds of African Americans boarded buses and sat in "Whites only" seats. On December 25, 1956, the night before the protest, Shuttlesworth's house was bombed, blasting him into the basement where he landed, still on his mattress. The fact that he emerged relatively unscathed left Shuttlesworth convinced that he was ordained to lead and contributed to his attitude of fearlessness. The demonstration went on as planned and resulted in 22 arrests, which in turn triggered ACMHR lawsuits asking for an injunction.

In February 1957 the ACMHR signed on as a charter member organization in the Southern Christian Leadership Conference. Shuttlesworth was named secretary of the SCLC. The next month he and his wife, Ruby, again challenged the segregated waiting rooms at Terminal Station. The couple were able to board their train without incident, but Lamar Weaver, a white man who had greeted them, was met by a violent mob outside the station when he tried to leave.

School integration
On September 9, 1957, just a week after black students were escorted by police into Central High School in Little Rock, Arkansas, Shuttlesworth attempted to enroll two of his daughters at J. H. Phillips High School and was met by a mob armed with bats and bicycle chains. Hospitalized but undaunted, he left University Hospital to attend a mass meeting that night, redoubling his message of nonviolence and faith. He pledged to continue the attempts until the schools were successfully integrated and initiated lawsuits against the city's board of education.

Mass meetings and resistance
By 1958 at least 55 "movement churches" were active in the ACMHR. Weekly mass meetings, filled with emotional testimony, music, and passionate preaching, raised an average of about $200–300 per week to fund the organization's lawsuits. Additional funds came from speaking engagements in other cities and from local supporters who did not join the group, including whites who were eager for change but could not risk certain retaliation for showing public support for the movement. In its first three years, the group spent over $40,000 of the $53,000 it raised on legal fees, much of it on black attorneys such as Arthur Shores, Orzell Billingsley, Oscar Adams, and Demetrius Newton of Birmingham and Ernest D. Jackson of Jacksonville, Florida. By 1965 the ACMHR had initiated more federal suits that reached the United States Supreme Court than any other petitioner. As the cases rose through the federal court system, they garnered assistance from the NAACP's legal defense fund.

Organized opponents of integration, including the Ku Klux Klan and the National States' Rights Party, threatened and intimidated movement supporters and conducted numerous bombings of churches and residences. Most of those terrorist acts were never prosecuted and their perpetrators acted with impunity, if not complicity, from city officials and police. In addition, white citizens who appeared uncommitted to segregation were terrorized by extremists. In the face of these challenges the ACHMR increased its membership, stirred at meetings by the Movement Choir, founded in July 1960 and directed by Carlton Reese. A group of volunteer guards stood watch at movement churches and pastor's homes and escorted Shuttlesworth and other leaders to appointments. Detectives from the Birmingham Police Department recorded the proceedings at most movement meetings. According to Colonel Stone Johnson, Commissioner Bull Connor would transfer officers from the assignment once they started to "get religion".

Freedom Rides
In 1961 the ACMHR helped organize the Alabama leg of that summer's Freedom Rides, sponsored by the Congress for Racial Equality. The demonstrations ended with marked violence as one bus was firebombed in Anniston and another was met by an organized mob at the Birmingham Trailways Station with no police in sight. ACMHR volunteers took injured riders to the hospital and kept them in their homes until rides could be secured to safety.

Birmingham campaign

Shuttlesworth and the ACMHR were responsible for inviting Martin Luther King Jr. and Ralph Abernathy to come to Birmingham to lead mass demonstrations in 1963. Though King urged quick action, Shuttlesworth insisted on waiting until the 1963 Birmingham mayoral election was completed to avoid giving candidate Bull Connor any unintentional assistance with voters wary of "outside agitators". On the day after the election, won by perceived moderate candidate Albert Boutwell, the ACMHR distributed a "Birmingham Manifesto", outlining the purpose and demands of the campaign. As it happened, even Birmingham's moderate leaders opposed the campaign on the grounds that the incoming administration should be given an opportunity to lead the city through long-needed changes. King's "Letter from Birmingham Jail" responded directly to local white religious leaders' plea for patience.

During the campaign, Shuttlesworth acted as an emotional leader for ACMHR's local membership while King, Abernathy, and others made attempts to bring uncommitted parties into the movement. SCLC's Wyatt Tee Walker planned the practical details of the early part of the campaign, later joined by the campaign defining efforts of James Bevel of SCLC, by Birmingham residents and activists A. D. King, Edward Gardner, and James Orange, and by others. The movement's joint Central Committee met regularly at the A. G. Gaston Motel to coordinate plans and issue statements to the press. As pickets and marches against segregated stores and lunch counters dragged on through the spring without evident progress, Bevel provided the spark by enlisting young people in the mass demonstrations, finally fulfilling the goal of "filling the jails" with nonviolent protesters and eventually providing the photographs and news footage of police dogs and fire hoses that shocked the world's sensibilities.

A truce was announced on May 10, but the bombings continued, escalating to the murderous bombing of 16th Street Baptist Church on September 15. The events in Birmingham made imperative the passage of the Civil Rights Act of 1964 and the Voting Rights Act of 1965.

Later years
Shuttlesworth had moved his family to the relative safety of Cincinnati, Ohio, where he had accepted the pulpit at Revelation Baptist Church in 1961. He traveled between Ohio and Alabama as he continued to lead the Birmingham movement. After the major events in Birmingham, the collegial relationships displayed publicly between Shuttlesworth and the leaders of the SCLC and other national civil rights groups began to fracture. Former ACMHR secretary Nelson H. Smith was tapped to head a Birmingham SCLC chapter. Shuttlesworth was left off the podium at the 1963 March on Washington for Jobs and Freedom and was not invited to join the group traveling to Oslo, Norway, to accept King's Nobel Prize for Peace.

In 1969 Shuttlesworth resigned as president of the ACMHR and was succeeded by Edward Gardner.

References

1956 establishments in Alabama
Organizations established in 1956
African Americans' rights organizations
Civil rights organizations in the United States
African-American history of Alabama
Organizations based in Birmingham, Alabama